The Statue of Diogenes is a monument to the Ancient Greek philosopher Diogenes of Sinope, who was born in Sinop , ancient Asia Minor, Turkey in about 412 BC.

Sinop (then known as Sinope) is the birthplace of Diogenes in the 5th century BC. Sinop municipality decided to erect a statue of Diogenes. Its creator was Turan Baş of the Ondokuz Mayıs University in Samsun. The statue was erected in 2006.

It is situated at the center of the narrowest point of Sinop Peninsula isthmus. Other historically notable places of the city (like Sinop Fortress Prison) are close to the monument.

According to the Turkish daily newspaper Milliyet, some politicians criticized the decision of the municipality on the ground that Diogenes searched for an honest man and thus insulted the honest people of Sinop. However, that legend had been originated in Athens and not in Sinop.

References

Buildings and structures in Sinop, Turkey
Statues in Turkey
Buildings and structures completed in 2006
Tourist attractions in Sinop, Turkey
Cultural depictions of Diogenes
Sculptures of men in Turkey
21st-century architecture in Turkey